Hysterical Psycho is a 2009 American horror comedy film written and directed by Dan Fogler.  It stars Randy Baruh, Noah Bean, Kelly Hutchinson, Charissa Chamorro, Nicholas DeCegli, and Kate Gersten as a group of friends who encounter "lunar radiation" that causes people to go insane.

Plot 
A theater troupe from New York City visit a secluded area known as Moon Lake.  Unknown to them, the cabin in which they stay is located on a Native American burial ground among other sites.  In addition, it is the location of a lunar meteorite that has bathed the area in radiation that causes people to go violently insane.

Cast 

Gilbert Gottfried and writer-director Dan Fogler appear in cameos.

Release 
Hysterical Psycho premiered at the Tribeca Film Festival.  Indican released it on DVD in the US on February 18, 2014.

Reception 
John Anderson of Variety wrote that it was probably more fun to make than it is to watch, as horror films have already parodied themselves at length. Bloody Disgusting rated it 4.5/5 stars and wrote, "Hysterical Psycho is by far one of the most absurd films I’ve ever admitted to loving."  Mark L. Miller of Ain't It Cool News compared it to Student Bodies and wrote, "There are moments that will definitely make you laugh, but in between those guffaws, I found myself mostly impressed by the intensity and creativity of the scares."  Matt Donato of We Got This Covered rated it 2.5/5 stars and wrote, "It's a shame that Hysterical Psycho never really comes together, because there are some hilariously horrifying moments of spoofy slasher goodness to be found here."

References

External links 
 
 

2009 films
2009 horror films
2009 comedy horror films
American black comedy films
American comedy horror films
American independent films
American slasher films
2009 directorial debut films
2009 comedy films
2009 independent films
2000s English-language films
2000s American films